The Pa Sak River (Pronunciation) is a river in central Thailand. The river originates in the Phetchabun Mountains, Dan Sai District, Loei Province, and passes through Phetchabun Province as the backbone of the province. It then passes through the eastern part of Lopburi Province and Saraburi Province, until it joins the Lopburi River northeast of Ayutthaya Island, before it runs into the Chao Phraya River southeast of Ayutthaya near Phet Fortress.

The valley of the Pa Sak through the Phetchabun mountains is a dominant feature of Phetchabun Province. Water levels vary seasonally. To address drought problems in the lower Pa Sak valley, in 1994 the construction of the Pa Sak Cholasit Dam (เขื่อนป่าสักชลสิทธิ์) in Lopburi Province was built. The dam also supplies about 6.7 MW of electricity.

Tributaries

Tributaries of the Pa Sak include the Lopburi River, Khlong Muak Lek, Huai Nam Phung, Huai Pa Daeng, Khlong Lam Kong, Lam Sonthi, Khlong Wang Chomphu, Khlong Huai Na, Huai Nam Chun, Huai Nam Duk, Huai Khon Kaen, Huai Yai, Khlong Saduang Yai, Khlong Ban Bong, Khlong Tarang, and Lam Phaya Klang.

Pa Sak Basin
The Pa Sak Basin is part of the Chao Phraya watershed.

References

External links
The Pasak Jolasit Dam project

Rivers of Thailand